Hans George Klemm (born August 21, 1957) is an  American diplomat who served as the United States Ambassador to Romania from September 21, 2015, to December 2019. Previously he also served as the United States ambassador to East Timor from June 12, 2007, to May 25, 2010.

Klemm graduated from Indiana University with a B.A. in Economics and History, and from Stanford University with an M.A in International Development Policy.

He joined the United States Foreign Service in 1981 and was promoted into the Senior Foreign Service in 2001.

From 2012 to 2015 he was Principal Deputy Assistant Secretary in the State Department's Bureau of Human Resources. As of January 2015, Klemm served as Senior Advisor to the Under Secretary for Management at the Department of State. In March 2015 President Barack Obama announced his intent to nominate Klemm as U.S. Ambassador to Romania. In September 2015, Klemm assumed the duties of U.S. Ambassador to Romania.

Klemm's father was a German immigrant.

Honour
  Romanian Royal Family: Knight of the Royal Decoration of Nihil Sine Deo

See also

List of ambassadors of the United States

References

External links

|-

1957 births
Living people
Ambassadors of the United States to East Timor
Ambassadors of the United States to Romania
Indiana University alumni
Stanford University alumni
United States Foreign Service personnel
21st-century American diplomats
American people of German descent